Holly Michelle Cassidy (born 1990) is a New Zealand model and beauty pageant titleholder who was crowned Miss New Zealand 2013 and represented her country at the Miss Universe 2013 pageant.

Early life
Cassisdy attended Tauranga Girls' College and works as an admin manager for Auckland real estate company Barfoot & Thompson. She is also a brand ambassador for a New Zealand energy drink.

Miss New Zealand 2013
Cassidy was crowned Miss Universe New Zealand 2013 at the conclusion of the pageant held in Auckland on 5 October 2013. She represented New Zealand in the Miss Universe 2013 pageant on 9 November 2013, held in Moscow, Russia, but failed to place in the semifinals.

References

External links
Miss New Zealand Official website

1990 births
Living people
Miss New Zealand winners
Miss Universe 2013 contestants